Carl Eric "Charlie" Brandt (February 23, 1957 – September 13, 2004) was an American serial killer who murdered at least four female victims; one in Indiana and three others in Florida. Growing up in Fort Wayne, Indiana, Brandt shot his parents in their family home on the night of January 3, 1971, when he was 13, killing his pregnant mother and wounding his father. He spent one year at a psychiatric hospital before being released and was never criminally charged. 33 years later, on September 13, 2004, Brandt stabbed his wife and niece to death and then hanged himself in his niece's garage. This incident, Brandt's efficiency in killing his wife and niece, and his hidden obsession with human anatomy led investigators to look into the possibility that he had committed other murders since moving to Florida in 1973. The 1989 murder of a homeless woman near Brandt's home was solved as a result of the investigation, as Brandt was found to have been the perpetrator. The police suspect him in three other Florida murders, but his true number of victims could potentially be more than 30.

Early life 
Charlie Brandt was the second child of Herbert and Ilsa Brandt, two German immigrants who originally settled in Texas before moving to Connecticut. Brandt's father worked as a laborer for a division of International Harvester, eventually working his way up to draftsman and project engineer. The family moved frequently and as a result Brandt and his older sister Angela attended several different schools. 

Brandt was regarded as a good student, but was shy and had difficulty adjusting to new surroundings. In September 1968, Herbert was transferred to International Harvester's plant in Fort Wayne, Indiana. The family frequently vacationed in Florida, where Brandt hunted small game with his father.

1971 murder 
On the evening of January 3, 1971, after their children had turned in for the night in their Fort Wayne home, Herbert Brandt was shaving in the bathroom while Ilsa, eight months pregnant, was taking a bath. Charlie Brandt, then aged 13, abruptly walked into the bathroom and shot both parents at point blank range with his father's handgun, which he had taken from a dresser. His father survived, but his mother and the fetus were killed instantly. Brandt then entered his sister Angela's room and attempted to shoot her, but his gun would not fire.

After a physical struggle, Angela managed to calm her brother down by promising him that she would help him figure out what to do. Angela eventually convinced Brandt to go upstairs to retrieve blankets for their infant sisters, who were unharmed, before fleeing the house and seeking help from neighbors. After pursuing his terrified sister outside, Brandt knocked on a neighbor's door, telling her, "I just shot my mom and dad." Herbert later identified his son as his attacker.

After the shooting, Brandt had told Angela that he could not remember what he had done. Angela described her brother as being in a trance-like state, which had broken during their struggle. Upon being interviewed by police, Brandt attributed the shooting to "a combination of things" related to school, stating that, "Everything sort of just snapped in my mind. I felt like I never felt before." Brandt also alluded to an incident that took place a few days before the shooting, near the end of his family's annual Christmas vacation in Florida, in which Herbert shot and killed their dog while the two were hunting. 

Three separate psychiatric evaluations failed to determine what triggered the shooting. Because he was too young to be tried for murder under Indiana state law, Brandt spent one year at a psychiatric hospital before being released back into the custody of his family in June 1972. The family never spoke of the incident again. Until 2004, Brandt's two younger sisters had lived under the impression that their mother had been killed in a car accident.

Relocation to Florida 
Shortly after Brandt's release, his family relocated to Ormond Beach, Florida. One year later, Brandt's father (who had remarried) and two younger sisters moved back to Indiana, while Brandt and Angela stayed behind in the care of their grandparents. In 1984, Brandt received a degree in electronics and became a radar specialist for Ford Aerospace in Astor. 

In 1986, Brandt married his girlfriend Theresa "Teri" Helfrich. No relatives were invited to their wedding. His sister Angela and her husband Jim had advised Brandt to tell Teri about the murder of their mother, but it is unclear whether or not he ever did. The couple settled in a beach house on Big Pine Key in 1989.

1989 and 2004 murders
On September 2, 2004, Brandt and Teri evacuated from their home ahead of Hurricane Ivan. Their niece, Michelle Lynn Jones, invited them to stay at her residence near Orlando. Throughout the visit, Jones kept in regular contact with her mother, Mary Lou, as well as several friends. On the evening of September 13, one of Jones' friends, Lisa Emmons, was scheduled to visit her house. However, Jones discouraged her from coming, saying that the Brandts had an argument after drinking. After that night, Jones stopped answering telephone calls, which alarmed her acquaintances.

On September 15, another one of Jones' friends, Debbie Knight, went to her house to check on her while on the phone with Jones' mother. After finding the front door locked, Knight tried to enter the house through the garage, where she found Brandt's decomposing body hanging from the rafters; he had hanged himself using bedsheets. Knight contacted the police, who entered the house and found the bodies of Brandt's wife and niece. Teri had been stabbed seven times in the chest while lying on a couch. Jones had been decapitated and disemboweled, with her heart and organs removed, and her head was placed next to her body. The weapons used in the crimes had been knives from Jones' kitchen.

Following the discovery of the bodies, a search of Brandt's residence on Big Pine Key revealed that he was a monthly subscriber to Victoria's Secret catalogs, had an extensive collection of surgery-themed books, posters, and clippings, and regularly searched online for autopsy photos and snuff film websites depicting violence against women. Police determined that Brandt's murder of Jones indicated past experience, and because he traveled often due to his job, police checked cold cases in Florida that matched his apparent modus operandi. They also launched requests for similar inquiries in the U.S. and abroad. The investigation uncovered evidence linking Brandt to the 1989 murder of a woman near his home.

38-year-old Sherry Perisho's partially-clothed body was found on July 16, 1989, floating in the water near the North Pine Channel Bridge at Big Pine Key where she lived on a dinghy. Her throat had been slashed and her head had been nearly severed. Like Jones, her body was extensively mutilated and her heart was removed. Perisho was found less than 1,000 feet from where Brandt lived, and Brandt matched a composite sketch of a man seen crossing U.S. Route 1 near where Perisho was discovered on the night she was murdered. Teri had further confided in her brother-in-law that she suspected Brandt in the Perisho killing, and that he had come home with blood on his shirt that night, which he claimed was from him filleting fish. Based on this evidence, Monroe County investigators determined that Brandt killed Perisho and officially closed the case on May 6, 2006.

Further investigation and other possible murders 
Ultimately, the search prompted police to reinvestigate twenty-six unsolved murders in Florida dating back to 1973 for potential evidence of Brandt's involvement. Aside from the 1989 Sherry Perisho murder, there was not enough evidence to conclusively link him to other crimes. However, three cases that were determined to have been of particular interest were:

 1978, Carol Sullivan, 12. Sullivan was abducted from a school bus stop in Volusia County on September 20, 1978. Her skull was found in a bucket, leading authorities to presume she was murdered and decapitated. Brandt was 20-years-old and lived in Volusia County at the time, but could not be tied to the crime in any other way.
 1988, Lisa Saunders, 20. Saunders was beaten, stabbed, and dragged from her car in Big Pine Key in December 1988. Her heart was missing when she was found, but it is unclear if it was extracted by an attacker or eaten by vultures.
 1995, Darlene Toler, 38. Toler was a sex worker from Miami whose body, missing her head and heart, was wrapped in plastic and blankets, and discovered dumped in a grassy area near a highway. Brandt used the same highway regularly and he kept a mileage record of his travels, which shows an entry for 100 miles  on the day of her murder, roughly the driving distance between Big Pine Key and the area of Miami where Toler's body was found.

See also 

 List of serial killers in the United States
 List of serial killers by number of victims 	
 List of people who died by suicide by hanging

References

1957 births
1971 murders in the United States
1978 murders in the United States
1988 murders in the United States
1989 murders in the United States
1995 murders in the United States
2004 murders in the United States
2004 suicides
20th-century American criminals
21st-century American criminals
American male criminals
American murderers of children
American people of German descent
American serial killers
Crime in Florida
Criminals from Florida
Criminals from Indiana
Male serial killers
Matricides
Murder in Florida
Murder–suicides in Florida
People from Fort Wayne, Indiana
Suicides by hanging in Florida
Uxoricides
Violence against women in the United States